was a town located in Kawanabe District, Kagoshima Prefecture, Japan. Chiran is famous for producing Japanese tea.

As of 2003, the town had an estimated population of 13,667 and the density of 113.71 persons per km². The total area was 120.19 km².

On December 1, 2007, Chiran, along with the town of Ei (from Ibusuki District), and the town of Kawanabe (also from Kawanabe District), was merged to form the new city of Minamikyūshū.

Education
Chiran has one junior high school: Chiran Junior High School, with 300 students.

Economy
Chiran has one of wire harness trading company.

Sorayoi
Sorayoi is one of the festivals that takes place on a night of full moon for children between four and thirteen. Sorayoi is short for Sorewayoi, meaning that's good.

Visitor attractions
 Chiran Castle - A castle ruin, one of the Continued Top 100 Japanese Castles .
 Chiran Samurai District - preserved samurai district with residence and garden in the Edo period.
 Chiran Peace Museum for Kamikaze Pilots

Gallery

See also
 Groups of Traditional Buildings
 Chiran Special Attack Peace Museum

References

External links
 

Dissolved municipalities of Kagoshima Prefecture